Daycoval is a midsize Brazil-based bank that provides personal and corporate banking services, such as credit, investment banking, credit card, brokerage, trade bill collection, custodian and deposit services, as well as payroll loans and auto loans under the Daycred brand name. 

The Bank specializes in lending services provide to small and mid-sized companies. Daycoval operates also in segments such as life, health, guarantee, business fire, car and risk insurance.

The Bank operates through its 31 bank branches distributed in 18 States in Brazil.

External links
 Official Website

References 

Companies listed on B3 (stock exchange)
Banks of Brazil